The 2016–17 New Mexico State Aggies women's basketball team represented New Mexico State University during the 2016–17 NCAA Division I women's basketball season. The Aggies, led by seventh year head coach Mark Trakh, played their home games at the Pan American Center and were members of the Western Athletic Conference. They finished the season 24–7, 14–0 in WAC play to win the regular season WAC championship. They defeated UMKC and Seattle to be champions of the WAC women's tournament.
They received an automatic bid to the NCAA tournament where they lost in the first round to Stanford. In that game, the Aggies nearly pulled off the monumental upset, leading 38-31 at halftime. The Cardinal cut the lead to one at the end of the third quarter before taking the lead for good halfway through the fourth.

Roster

Schedule

|-
!colspan=9 style="background:#882345; color:#FFFFFF;"| Non-conference regular season

|-
!colspan=9 style="background:#882345; color:#FFFFFF;"| WAC regular season

|-
!colspan=9 style="background:#882345; color:#FFFFFF;"| WAC Women's Tournament

|-
!colspan=9 style="background:#882345; color:#FFFFFF;"| NCAA Women's Tournament

See also
2016–17 New Mexico State Aggies men's basketball team

References

New Mexico State Aggies women's basketball seasons
New Mexico State
New Mexico State